The FIBA Under-19 Basketball World Cup (formerly FIBA Under-19 World Championship) is the under-19 men's world basketball championship organised by the International Basketball Federation (FIBA). From its inauguration in 1979, until 2007, it was held every four years. Since 2007, it has been held biennially. The current champions are the United States, who defeated France in 2021.

Summaries

 A round-robin tournament determined the final standings.

Medal table

Participation details

Debut of national teams

Tournament awards

Most recent award winners (2021)

See also
FIBA Under-17 Basketball World Cup
FIBA Under-17 Women's Basketball World Cup
FIBA Under-19 Women's Basketball World Cup

References

External links
Brazilian History
USA history

 
Under
Under-19 basketball competitions between national teams
World youth sports competitions
World championships in basketball
Recurring sporting events established in 1979